Thomas Benjamin Fitzpatrick (1896 – 1974) was a United States Navy Commander and the governor of American Samoa for a brief time from January 15, 1936, to January 20, 1936. During World War II, Fitzpatrick commanded , which landed troops and sustained damage during the Battle of Tarawa.

References

1896 births
1974 deaths
Governors of American Samoa
United States Navy personnel of World War II
United States Navy officers